Have Another Ball is a compilation album by the punk rock cover band Me First and the Gimme Gimmes. It is their seventh album overall, and was released on July 8, 2008 by Fat Wreck Chords.

The album features songs dating back to before their first album, Have a Ball.  Many of the tracks were previously released on now out-of-print 7" vinyl singles, while others were featured on compilation albums.

Track listing

Personnel
 Spike Slawson - vocals
 Chris Shiflett (a.k.a. Jake Jackson) - lead guitar
 Joey Cape - rhythm guitar
 Fat Mike - bass
 Dave Raun - drums

See also 
Me First and the Gimme Gimmes discography

References 

Me First and the Gimme Gimmes albums
2008 compilation albums
Fat Wreck Chords compilation albums